Robert Earl Cone (February 27, 1894 – May 24, 1955) was an American Major League Baseball pitcher and one of the early urologists in Texas.

Biography
Cone was born in Galveston, Texas, where he attended Ball High School. He played baseball at the University of Texas at Austin from 1912 to 1915. He played for the Philadelphia Athletics during the  season. 

After his baseball career, Cone attended medical school, graduating from the University of Texas Medical Branch (UTMB) in 1919. He became a urologist affiliated with the same institution, establishing urology as a distinct surgical specialty at UTMB and remaining the urology chief until his death. The Texas Urological Society was formed at Cone's home in Galveston. 

Cone married Mallie Parten in 1926. The couple had two children. Cone died in 1955.

References

1894 births
1955 deaths
Major League Baseball pitchers
Philadelphia Athletics players
Baseball players from Texas
Sportspeople from Galveston, Texas
Texas Longhorns baseball players
University of Texas at Austin alumni
University of Texas Medical Branch alumni
University of Texas Medical Branch faculty
American urologists